Xiang Runkun (11 October 1906 – 24 July 1980) was a Chinese politician. She was among the first group of women elected to the Legislative Yuan in 1948.

Biography
She joined the Kuomintang and became an executive member of the party and chair of the Shenyang Women's Association.

Xiang was a Kuomintang candidate in Shenyang in the 1948 elections for the Legislative Yuan and was elected to parliament. She relocated to Taiwan during the Chinese Civil War and remained a member of the Legislative Yuan until her death in 1980.

References

1906 births
Kuomintang Members of the Legislative Yuan in Taiwan
20th-century Chinese women politicians
Members of the 1st Legislative Yuan
Members of the 1st Legislative Yuan in Taiwan
1980 deaths
Taiwanese people from Liaoning
Republic of China politicians from Liaoning
Politicians from Shenyang
Chinese Civil War refugees
20th-century Taiwanese women politicians